Iroquois-class homeodomain protein IRX-2, also known as Iroquois homeobox protein 2, is a protein that in humans is encoded by the IRX2 gene.

Function 
IRX2 is a member of the Iroquois homeobox gene family. Members of this family appear to play multiple roles during pattern formation of vertebrate embryos.

Cancer 
IRX2 gene has been observed progressively downregulated in Human papillomavirus-positive neoplastic keratinocytes derived from uterine cervical  preneoplastic lesions at different levels of malignancy.  For this reason, IRX2 is likely to be associated with tumorigenesis and may be a potential prognostic marker for uterine cervical  preneoplastic lesions progression.

References

Further reading